The royal Flight to Varennes during the night of 20–21 June 1791 was a significant event in the French Revolution in which King Louis XVI of France, Queen Marie Antoinette, and their immediate family unsuccessfully attempted to escape from Paris in order to initiate a counter-revolution at the head of loyal troops under royalist officers concentrated at Montmédy near the frontier. They escaped only as far as the small town of Varennes-en-Argonne, where they were arrested after having been recognized at their previous stop in Sainte-Menehould.

This incident was a turning point after which popular hostility towards the French monarchy as an institution, as well as towards the king and queen as individuals, became much more pronounced. The king's attempted flight provoked charges of treason that ultimately led to his execution in 1793.

The escape failed due to a series of misadventures, delays, misinterpretations and poor judgments. Much was due to the king's indecision; he repeatedly postponed the schedule, allowing small problems to become much larger. Furthermore, he overestimated popular support for the traditional monarchy, mistakenly believing only Parisian radicals supported the revolution and that the populace as a whole opposed it. He also mistakenly believed that he enjoyed particular favor with the peasantry and other commoners.

The king's flight was traumatic for France, inciting reactions ranging from anxiety to violence and panic. Everyone was aware that foreign intervention was imminent. The realization that the king had effectually repudiated the revolutionary reforms made up to that point came as a shock to people who had seen him as a well-intentioned monarch who governed as a manifestation of God's will. Republicanism quickly evolved from being merely a subject of coffeehouse debate to the dominant ideal of revolutionary leaders.

The king's brother also fled on the same night, by a different route.  He successfully escaped, and spent the French revolution in exile, later returning to be crowned King Louis XVIII.

Background
Louis XVI's indecisive response was one of the causes of the forcible transfer of the royal family from the Palace of Versailles to the Tuileries in Paris on 6 October 1789 after The Women's March on Versailles. The relocation seemed to have emotionally paralyzed the king, which left many important decisions to the politically untrained queen. On 28 February 1791, while the Marquis de Lafayette was handling a conflict in Vincennes, hundreds of royalists came to the Tuileries to demonstrate in support of the royal family, only to be expelled from the palace by National Guards.

Objectives of flight
The intended goal of the unsuccessful flight was to provide the king with greater freedom of action and personal security than was possible in Paris. At Montmédy, General François Claude de Bouillé, the marquis de Bouillé, had concentrated a force of 10,000 regulars of the old royal army who were considered to still be loyal to the monarchy.  De Bouillé himself had shown energy in suppressing a serious mutiny in Nancy in 1790. The troops under his command included two Swiss and four German mercenary regiments who were perceived as being more reliable in a time of general political unrest than their French counterparts.
In a letter drafted for presentation to the Diet of the Swiss Cantons at Zurich, the royalist baron de Breteuil stated that "His Majesty desires to have such imposing forces at his disposition, that even the most audacious rebels will have no other option than to submit". The court expectation was that "numerous faithful subjects of all classes" would then rally to demand the restoration of the rights of the throne and that order would be restored without the need for civil war or foreign invasion.

The long-term political objectives of the royal couple and their closest advisors remain unclear. A detailed document entitled Declaration to the French People prepared by Louis for presentation to the National Assembly and left behind in the Tuileries indicates that his personal goal was a return to the concessions and compromises contained in the declaration of the Third Estate on 23 June 1789, immediately prior to the outbreak of violence in Paris and the storming of the Bastille. Private correspondence from Marie Antoinette takes a more reactionary line looking to a restoration of the old monarchy without concessions; though referring to pardons for all but the revolutionary leadership and the city of Paris "if it does not return to its old order".

The flight attempt 
Prodded by the queen, Louis committed himself and his family to a disastrous escape attempt from the capital to the eastern frontier on 21 June 1791. With the dauphin's governess, the Marquise de Tourzel, taking on the role of a Russian baroness, the queen and the king's sister Madame Élisabeth playing the roles of governess and nurse respectively, the king a valet, and the royal children her daughters, the royal family made their escape leaving the Tuileries Palace at about midnight. The escape was largely planned by the queen's favourite, the Swedish Count Axel von Fersen and the Baron de Breteuil, who had garnered support from Swedish King Gustavus III. Fersen had urged the use of two light carriages that could have made the 200-mile journey to Montmédy relatively quickly. This would have involved the splitting up of the royal family, however, thus Louis and Marie-Antoinette decided on the use of a heavy and conspicuous coach drawn by six horses.

Unmasking and arrest 

Due to the cumulative effect of slow progression, time miscalculations, lack of secrecy, and the need to repair broken coach traces, the royal family was thwarted in its escape attempt after leaving Paris. Louis himself chatted with peasants while horses were being changed at Fromentieres and Marie Antoinette gave silver dishes to a helpful local official at Chaintrix. At Châlons townspeople reportedly greeted and applauded the royal party. Finally, Jean-Baptiste Drouet, the postmaster of Sainte-Menehould, recognized the king from his portrait printed on an assignat in his possession. Seven detachments of cavalry posted along the intended route had been withdrawn or neutralized by suspicious crowds before the large and slow moving vehicle being used by the royal party had reached them. The king and his family were eventually arrested in the town of Varennes, 50 km (31 miles) from their ultimate destination, the heavily fortified royalist citadel of Montmédy.

Whether De Bouillé's army would have been numerous or reliable enough to change the direction of the revolution and preserve the monarchy can never be known.

Confinement to Tuileries Palace 

When the royal family finally returned under guard to Paris, the revolutionary crowd met the royal carriage with uncharacteristic silence and consequently, complete shock rippled throughout the crowd at the sight of their king. The royal family was confined to the Tuileries Palace. From this point forward, the abolition of the monarchy and the establishment of a republic became an ever-increasing possibility. The credibility of the king as a constitutional monarch had been seriously undermined by the escape attempt.

After they returned, the National Constituent Assembly agreed that the king could be restored to power if he agreed to the constitution. However, various factions in Paris like the Cordeliers and the Jacobins disagreed, and this led to a protest at the Champ de Mars; the protest turned violent, resulting in the Champ de Mars Massacre.

From the autumn of 1791 on, the king tied his hopes of political salvation to the dubious prospects of foreign intervention. At the same time, he encouraged the Girondin faction in the Legislative Assembly in their policy of war with Austria, in the expectation that a French military disaster would pave the way for the restoration of his royal authority. Prompted by Marie Antoinette, Louis rejected the advice of the moderate constitutionalists, led by Antoine Barnave, to fully implement the Constitution of 1791, which he had sworn to maintain. He instead secretly committed himself to a policy of covert counter-revolution.

Abolishing the monarchy
The king's failed escape attempt alarmed many other European monarchs, who feared that the revolutionary fervor would spread to their countries and result in instability outside France. Relations between France and its neighbors, already strained because of the revolution, deteriorated even further with some foreign ministries calling for war against the revolutionary government.

The outbreak of the war with Austria in April 1792 and the publication of a manifesto by the Prussian commander, Charles William Ferdinand, Duke of Brunswick, threatened the destruction of Paris if the safety of the royal family was again endangered. Upon hearing this, Parisian radicals stormed the Tuileries Palace on 10 August 1792. This was the event that sounded the death knell for the monarch.

This attack led in turn to the suspension of the king's powers by the Legislative Assembly and the proclamation of the First French Republic on 21 September. In November, proof of Louis XVI's secret dealings with the deceased revolutionary politician, Mirabeau, and of his counterrevolutionary intrigues with foreigners was found in a secret iron chest, the armoire de fer, in the Tuileries. It was now no longer possible to pretend that the reforms of the French Revolution had been made with the free consent of the king. Some Republicans called for his deposition, others for his trial for alleged treason and intended defection to the enemies of the French Nation. On 3 December, it was decided that Louis XVI, who together with his family had been imprisoned since August, should be brought to trial for treason. He appeared twice, on 11 and 23 December, before the National Convention.

Convicted, Louis was sent to the guillotine on 21 January 1793. Nine months later, Marie Antoinette was also convicted of treason, and was beheaded on 16 October. (She asked the prosecutor to kill her as well, as she couldn't "suffer for long").

References

Further reading
 Dunn, Susan. The Deaths of Louis XVI: Regicide and the French Political Imagination (1994).
 
 Loomis, Stanley, The Fatal Friendship: Marie Antoinette, Count Fersen and the Flight to Varennes, Avon Books, 1972. 
 Timothy Tackett, When the King Took Flight, Cambridge: Harvard University Press, 2003.
 Thompson, J. M.  The French Revolution (1943) 206–27, detailed narrative with explanation of what went wrong 
 The article also draws material from the out-of-copyright History of the French Revolution from 1789 to 1814, by François Mignet (1824), as made available by Project Gutenberg.''

External links 

 Fuite de Varennes - the French Wikipedia article
 The Flight to Varennes • Memoir by the Duchesse d'Angoulême

1791 events of the French Revolution
1791 in France
Louis XVI
Marie Antoinette
History of Meuse (department)